The 1979 Northern Iowa Panthers football team represented the University of Northern Iowa in the 1979 NCAA Division II football season.

Schedule

References 

Northern Iowa
Northern Iowa Panthers football seasons
Northern Iowa Panthers football